Shahzada Alam Monnoo (1936 – 18 November 2014) was a Pakistani industrialist and politician. He served in the Federal cabinet as Minister of Commerce and Textile Industry, Privatization and Investment between 15 November 2007 and  25 March 2008. He died on 18 November 2014.

Early life and career
Monnoo was born in 1936 into the well-known Chinioti business clan. His sister is married to Mian Habib Ullah, who also served as a Minister in Benzair's tenure and Mr Habib Ullah is a former President of Federation of Pakistan Chambers of Commerce & Industry (FPCCI) and Trade Development Authority (Pakistan) and current Honorary Consul-General of Cyprus in Pakistan. Mr Monnoo initially studied in Welham Boys School, Dehradun in British India and had to leave it with the independence of Pakistan in 1947 and then he shifted to Aitchison College in  Lahore and later, the College of Textiles at North Carolina State College, North Carolina, United States.

In 1965, he introduced the first Toyota Motors assembly plant in Karachi, then known as Monnoo Toyota Motors. However the industry was nationalized by Zulfiqar Ali Bhutto in 1972, along with many others.  Monnoo had since become highly influential in the textile sector in Pakistan, becoming the president of Monnoo Group of Industries, which owns a number of diversified industries in Pakistan. He was the owner of nearly 20 mills in Faisalabad and other locations in Pakistan and had served as chairman of the APTMA (All Pakistan Textile Mills Association) and was the founding member of Lahore Chamber of Commerce and Industry.  Based in Lahore, although the Monnoo Group has diversified into agricultural farming and mango production in recent years, the company is mainly concentrated in the textiles and sugar industry.

Philanthropist
Monnoo was also noted for his work in healthcare in Pakistan and had made considerable contributions towards the Business Hospital Trust,  Shaikh Zayed Hospital,  and Shaukat Khanum Cancer Hospital in Lahore. He had also established several mosques in the country.

Achievements
Shahzada Alam Monnoo had been appointed as Federal Minister for Commerce, Trade and Industry in the Caretaker set up of the Prime Minister Muhammad Mian Soomro. He served as Chairman, All Pakistan Textile Mills Association (APTMA) and was a former President of Lahore Chamber of Commerce and Industry. He also contributed to various sectors as Director - National Fibres Limited, Director - Pakistan Industrial Credit and Investment Corporation Limited, Member, Board of Governors, Aitchison College, Lahore, Member, Board of Governors, Postgraduate Medical Institute/Services Hospital, Lahore and also as Director, Trust for Voluntary Organization, Ministry of Economic Affairs.

Death and legacy
The Monnoo family is a traditional name in Pakistan that has been the story of success for the industrial growth of Pakistan. He died on Tuesday 18 November 2014 in Lahore. His son, Shahbaz Monnoo, is married to the granddaughter of famous industrialist Syed Wajid Ali. Among the survivors are also his two brothers Jehangir Monnoo and Kaiser Monnoo.

References

1936 births
2014 deaths
Pakistani industrialists
Pakistani philanthropists
Aitchison College alumni
Pakistani company founders
Chinioti people
Federal ministers of Pakistan
20th-century philanthropists